During the American Civil War, Ohio contributed many officers, politicians, and troops to the Union war effort; as well as a small number for the Confederacy.

Union
The following is a partial list of generals or rear admirals either born in Ohio or living in Ohio when they joined the Union Army or Union Navy (or in a few cases, men who were buried in Ohio following the war, although they did not directly serve in Ohio units). There also were 134 men given the brevet rank of brigadier general, and occasionally brevet major general, a few of whom are also included in this listing.

Confederacy

In addition, the following Ohioans served as generals in the Confederate States Army:

 Charles Clark
 Robert H. Hatton
 Bushrod Johnson
 Philip N. Luckett
 Daniel H. Reynolds
 Roswell S. Ripley
 Otho F. Strahl

See also
Ohio in the American Civil War
List of American Civil War generals (Union)
List of American Civil War brevet generals (Union)
List of American Civil War generals (Confederate)

 Generals
Generals 
Ohio Generals
American Civil War
Civil War generals